NGC 3532 (Caldwell 91), also commonly known as the Pincushion Cluster, Football Cluster, the Black Arrow Cluster and the Wishing Well Cluster, is an open cluster some 405 parsecs from Earth in the constellation Carina. Its population of approximately 150 stars of 7th magnitude or fainter includes seven red giants and seven white dwarfs. On 20 May 1990 it became the first target ever observed by the Hubble Space Telescope. A line from Beta Crucis through Delta Crucis passes somewhat to the north of NGC 3532. The cluster lies between the constellation Crux and the larger but fainter "False Cross" asterism. The 4th-magnitude Cepheid variable star x Carinae (V382 Car) appears near the southeast fringes, but it lies between the Sun and the cluster and is not a member of the cluster.

The cluster was first catalogued by Nicolas Louis de Lacaille in  1752. It was admired by John Herschel, who thought it one of the finest star clusters in the sky, with many double stars (binary stars).

Hubble first light

References

External links

 

Carina (constellation)

Open clusters

3532
091b
17520125
1990 in science